Hyun-a, also spelled Hyun-ah and Hyeon-a, is a Korean feminine given name. Its meaning differs based on the hanja used to write each syllable of the name. There are 35 hanja with the reading "hyun" and 20 hanja with the reading "a" on the South Korean government's official list of hanja which may be used in given names.

Notable people with the name include:

Kim Hyun-ah (born 1971), stage name Kim Jung-nan, South Korean actress
Kong Hyun-ah (born 1972), South Korean sport shooter
Sung Hyun-ah (born 1975), South Korean actress
Sung Hyun-ah (footballer) (born 1982), South Korean footballer
Hyuna (full name Kim Hyun-ah; born 1992), South Korean singer, former member of girl groups 4minute and Wonder Girls
Hwang Hyeon-a (born 1994), South Korean field hockey player

Fictional characters with this name include:
Seo Hyun-ah, in 2005 South Korean television series Super Rookie
Hyun-ah, in 2009 South Korean film Sisters on the Road
Oh Hyun-ah, in 2011 South Korean television series A Thousand Days' Promise

See also
List of Korean given names

References

Korean feminine given names